Raoul Fahlin (born 13 October 1966) is a Swedish former cyclist. He competed in the road race at the 1988 Summer Olympics.

References

External links
 

1966 births
Living people
Swedish male cyclists
Olympic cyclists of Sweden
Cyclists at the 1988 Summer Olympics
Sportspeople from Örebro